Pseudocastalia is a genus of beetles in the family Buprestidae, containing the following species:

 Pseudocastalia arabica (Gestro, 1877)
 Pseudocastalia bennigseni Kraatz, 1896
 Pseudocastalia mattheei Holm, 1982
 Pseudocastalia penrithae Holm, 1982

References

Buprestidae genera